Idrettslaget Trott is a Norwegian association football club from Rommetveit, Stord, Hordaland.

The men's football team currently plays in the Fourth Division, the fifth tier of Norwegian football. It last played in the Norwegian Second Division in 1997.

References

 Official site 

Football clubs in Norway
Sport in Hordaland
Stord
Association football clubs established in 1948
1948 establishments in Norway